Deshabandu Karuppiahyage Ravindra Pushpakumara (born 21 July 1975), or Ravindra Pushpakumara, is a former Sri Lankan cricketer of Tamil - Sinhalese mixed ancestry. He is a right-handed batsman and a right-arm medium-fast bowler. He was a key member of Sri Lanka's 1996 Cricket World Cup winning team.

Early and domestic career
Pushpakumura was educated at St. John's College Panadura. He made his Twenty20 debut on 17 August 2004, for Nondescripts Cricket Club in the 2004 SLC Twenty20 Tournament.

International career
Having impressed with Sri Lanka's Under-19s side, Pushpakumura made his Test debut in August 1994 against Pakistan, where he was noted as the fastest bowler Sri Lanka had had for many years.

Despite his pace, his variation on duller pitches was lacking, and thus he failed to get into the Sri Lankan side on a regular basis. His best bowling figure in a Test innings is 7/116 which he made against Zimbabwe at Harare Sports Club in 1994/95. Pushpakumara could be viewed as another fast bowling prospect which failed to live up to expectation from Sri Lanka. Some started to call him "Wild Johnny" for his waiwerd lines he came up with more often than not. Pushpakumura's last Test was against Bangladesh in the Asian Test Championship. Since 2004 he has played Twenty-20 cricket.

References 

1975 births
Living people
Basnahira South cricketers
Sri Lanka One Day International cricketers
Sri Lanka Test cricketers
Sri Lankan cricketers
Nondescripts Cricket Club cricketers
Uva cricketers
Alumni of St. John's College, Panadura
Deshabandu
People from Panadura